Mathoor is a small village located near Omallur in the Pathanamthitta district of Kerala, India.

Religious Centres
Mathoorkavu Bhagavathi Kshethram
St. George Orthodox Church
St. George Malankara Catholic Church
Thumpinpadu Nagaraja Temple
Mahadeva Temple Puliparamala

References 

Villages in Pathanamthitta district